Tim Johnson (born October 18, 1953) is an American curler from Bemidji, Minnesota.

Personal life
Johnson has two daughters, Jamie and Cassie, who are successful curlers themselves, having won the silver medal at the 2005 World Women's Curling Championship and competed at the 2006 Winter Olympics.

Teams

Men's

Mixed

References

External links
 

Living people
American male curlers
American curling champions
1953 births
People from Hallock, Minnesota